Pannona was a town in the interior of ancient Crete, south of Cnossus.

Its site is tentatively located near modern Agios Thomas.

References

Populated places in ancient Crete
Former populated places in Greece